Jean-Claude Touche (7 August 1926 – 29 August 1944) was a French musician, organist and composer.

Biography 
Jean-Claude Touche was born in Paris. His father, Firmin Touche, was concertmaster of the Concerts Colonne and academic at the Conservatoire de Paris.

In 1941, he entered the Conservatoire de Paris where Henri Rabaud had just given way to Claude Delvincourt. He attended the classes of Maurice Duruflé and Marcel Dupré. He won a first prize in organ in 1944, three months before his death.

During his very short existence, he composed some quality works: Thème et variations sur Veni creator and a Pastorale pour orgue.

"He had the virtuoso's gifts, clarity, flames. His executions were at the same time thoughtful and alive. He loved improvisation and shared with his listeners his aspirations and religious ecstasy." Thus spoke Marcel Dupré about his student.

In Le Figaro dated 12 August 1999, Hélène de Felice wrote: "All those who knew Jean-Claude Touche have an extraordinary memory of him. He possessed the charisma that beauty brings to the intelligence, the beauty of the mind and the beauty of the heart. He radiated a real faith, that which leads to total devotion..."

Unknown to the public, Jean-Claude Touche could have become a very great French musician and conductor. Trying to pick up a wounded person laying on a stretcher on rue de Rivoli, at the corner of the place de la Concorde, a German bullet came to strike mortally this young musician, eighteen years old, on 25 August 1944, during the battles of the Liberation of Paris. He died on 29 August 1944 after a desperate surgery. Touche is buried at Père-Lachaise Cemetery (44th division).

References

External links 

 Jean-Claude Touche, ce héros méconnu on Musimen
 Jean-Claude TOUCHE on 'Amis et passionnés du Père Lachaise'
 Notes by Jean-Claude Touche's mother

20th-century French composers
French male composers
French classical organists
French male organists
Musicians from Paris
Conservatoire de Paris alumni
1926 births
1944 deaths
Burials at Père Lachaise Cemetery
20th-century organists
20th-century French male musicians
French civilians killed in World War II
Deaths by firearm in France
Male classical organists